Paul Clarke may refer to:

Paul Clarke (Irish footballer) (born 1966), Gaelic football player for Dublin
Paul Clarke (Scottish footballer) (born 1956), association football player for Kilmarnock
Paul Clarke (Australian footballer) (1909–1969), Australian rules footballer
Paul Clarke (rugby league), Australian rugby league player
Paul Clarke (Big Brother), housemate in the second series of Big Brother in the UK
Paul Clarke (character), from the Henderson's Boys series of young adult spy novels
Paul Robert Virgo Clarke, Clerk of the Council of the Duchy of Lancaster

See also
Paul Clark (disambiguation)